The Dehong Dai and Jingpo Autonomous Prefecture is located in western Yunnan province, People's Republic of China, and is one of the eight autonomous prefectures of the province, bordering Baoshan to the east and Burma's Kachin State to the west.

Etymology

Tai Nuea is the origin language of the word "Dehong", in Tai Le script (the script used to write the Tai Nüa language by the Tai Nua people) is written as "", which transliterates to Latin as "Taue Xoong". Dehong means the lower reaches of the Nu River.

However, the Mandarin characters for Dehong are "." These two characters are a compound of  "moral, value" and  "magnificent, great, macro". Thus, from the Mandarin Chinese point of view,  (Dehong) means "moral" + "magnificent", so it means "magnificent (great) moral (value)".

History

Early history

Dianyue and Ailao were the ancient countries recorded in Chinese literature in the Dehong area, and Guozhanbi (Kawsampi) was an ancient country established by the Dai people and recorded in Dai legends.

Dianyue

In the history book Records of the Grand Historian written by Sima Qian during the Han dynasty, a paragraph in volume 123 describes Dianyue as when Zhang Qian visited Daxia in Central Asia, he found some merchandise that was produced in Sichuan. And the Daxia merchant said it was purchased from Yuandu (India). There was a trade route, Shu-Yuandu Road, between Yuandu and Sichuan. The road passed a kingdom named "Dianyue". The country is also called "Dianyue Chengxiang" in modern books.Chinese historians generally said Tengyue was the center of Dianyue Chengxiang, and the territory included the Dehong area. However, some historians disagree with this opinion. Lou Zichang believes Dianyue Chengxiang was not a country in western Yunnan, nor was it a country established by the Dai people.

Ailao

Ai Lao was an ancient tribal alliance country in the west of Yunnan from the Spring and Autumn to the Eastern Han periods, and modern historians say the area included Dehong. In Chronicles of Huayang, the record of Ailao mentions its territory "3,000 li from west to east, and 4,600 li from south to north", approximately equal to 1,300 km west to east and 1,994 km south to north in modern units. It includes the southwest of Yunnan and most of Myanmar, and in modern research, it is called the generalized area of Ailao.

In the Han period, Ailao was an influential tribal country with a population of 20,000. Baoshan historian Xiao Zhengwei believes the kingdom of Dianyue was a powerful tribe under Ailao.

In 69 AD, Liu Mao, the king of Ailao, led the tribal alliance to surrender to the Han dynasty, and Han set "Ailao County" here. During the Southern dynasty Qi period, the name was changed to "Xicheng County". During the end of the Liang dynasty, Xicheng County was abolished.

Guozhanbi

Between 568 BC and 424 BC, during the Eastern Zhou dynasty in China, the ancestors of the Dai people had settled in the Shweli River valley area and entered the tribal period. In 364 BC, grand chief Gelaba unified the tribes in the Shweli basin. He became the chief of the tribal alliance and set the capital at Hansa (in modern Ruili). It was the early stage of the "Guozhanbi"() Kingdom, also called "Kawsampi".

In 364 AD, a descendant of Gelaba named Zhaowuding inherited the throne. He became a famous deity, sovereign, and culture hero of the Dai people. In the 7th century, the Dai area was in chaos, and the descendants of Zhaowuding could not effectively control the area. At the same time, the kingdom of Nanzhao was rising and conquered the Dehong area. Piluoge, the king of Nanzhao, canonized another Dai tribe chief named Hundeng to be the "King of Mong Mao" and managed the whole Dai area in 762.

In 1995, Dehong historian Yang Yongsheng published research on the ancient Dai civilization. He put forward a new opinion during the Dai legend research — The "Kingdom of Daguang" is the first country of the Dai people which was established in 424 BC, and the country "Dianyue Chengxiang" is another name for "Daguang". In 233 BC, the capital of Daguang moved to Pagan, and finally perished in 586 AD. The research was countered by He Ping, a history professor at Yunnan University. He Ping says that the Kingdom of Daguang is the legendary kingdom of Tagaung in Burmese history and there was no kingdom of "Daguang" in the ancient Dai civilization. The Dai legend of Daguang is the story of pre-period of the Pyu city-states. The story of the Pyu city-states spread to the Dehong Dai area, localized to a Dai legend, and was recorded in Dai literature.

In Yang Yongsheng's research, the kingdom of "Guozhanbi" was the second kingdom established by the Dai people after Daguang. Dai language literatures were his sources of research. He said the kingdom of Guozhanbi was in existence from 567 to 1488. According to the research of He Ping, "Guozhanbi" is the ancient state "Kawsampi" or Kosambi. There are many legends about Kawsampi in Thai-Shan folklore. The origin of the legend was a story in Buddhist texts. Therefore, He Ping thought the Kingdom of "Guozhanbi" or "Kawsampi" is an untrustworthy history.

Medieval

Whether or not the early history of Dehong is controversial, it can be determined that Dehong belonged to Nanzhao and Dali in the medieval period of Yunnan. In Nanzhao, it was divided into "Yongchang Jiedu" (south of Dehong) and "Lishui Jiedu" (north of Dehong). In Dali, it was under the division of "Zhenxi Zhen".

In 1253, Kublai Khan conquered the Dali Kingdom, and the Dehong Dai people capitulated to the Mongol Empire. The Mongols set up an administrative division called "Jinchi Anfu Si" to manage the west of Yunnan. In 1276, during the Yuan dynasty, the Anfu Si was upgraded to "Jinchi Xuanfu Si", and established the agency "6 Lu governor Fu" to manage the Dehong area. The 6 Lu were: Luchuan Lu (modern Ruili and Longchuan), Pingmian Lu (modern southern Lianghe and northern Longchuan), Zhenxi Lu (modern Yingjiang), Zhenkang Lu (modern Zhenkang, out of Dehong), Mangshi Lu (modern Mangshi), and Rouyuan Lu (modern Lujiang, out of Dehong). In addition, the special divisions named "Nan Dan" and Nandian Fu (modern Lianghe) were established. The scope of "6 Lu general manager Fu" was close to the modern Dehong territory.

In 1277, Narathihapate, the king of the Burmese Pagan Kingdom, invaded the modern Dehong area. The Battle of Ngasaunggyan occurred on the bank of the Taping River, presently in Yingjiang County. The Yuan army only had 700 soldiers but eventually repelled the Burmese military of 40,000 to 50,000 soldiers with 10,000 horses and 800 elephants. It was the prelude to the First Mongol invasion of Burma.

During the 13th and 14th centuries, the Dehong Dai people immigrated to modern Assam in India and built up the kingdom of Ahom. They formed the latter-day Ahom people.

Mong Mao

The local Dai chief was the leader of Luchuan Lu, and they were the successors of "Guozhanbi". "Luchuan" is the name denoted by Yuan, and "Mong Mao" is a self-claimed name.

Si Kefa enthroned the chieftain of Luchuan Lu in 1340 and sent troops to the surrounding states such Hsenwi, Mongyang, and Mongmit. After that, he attacked Mangshi, Zhenxi, Pingmian, and Nandian. The Yuan dynasty initiated wars in 1342, 1345, 1346, and 1347 to counterattack Luchuan, but all the attempts failed. Luchuan conquered the surrounding states successively. In 1355, Si Kefa asked the Yuan dynasty to canonize him. The Yuan central government admitted his local regime and canonized Si Kefa to be the first Mong Mao Tusi. The central government set a division of "Pingmian Xuanwei Si" at Mong Mao to legalize the regime, and Mong Mao Tusi was the leader of Xuanwei Si.

In 1382, the Ming dynasty military arrived at the Mong Mao Tusi and Si Lunfa surrendered. Ming granted him the title "Xuanwei Commissioner of Luchuan Pingmian" and changed the division name "Luchuan Pingmian Xuanwei Si". In 1385, the leader of Jingdong renegaded the Mong Mao regime, and Si Lunfa sent troops to attack Jingdong. However, Mu Ying, the general of Yunnan, was protecting the Jingdong leader.

The wars between the Mong Mao regime and the Yunnan local government occurred in 1387 and 1388. Finally, Mong Mao failed. In order to maintain the relationship with Ming, Si Lunfa sent a mission to Kunming to make peace. Mong Mao consented to compensate for the losses, and peace was restored.

After Si Lunfa died in 1399, a minister of Mong Mao launched a rebellion. The Ming government felt threatened and separated 14 Tusi regions from the Luchuan territory. During Si Xingfa's rule in the 1410s, the Mong Mao territory decreased to include only modern Ruili, Mangshi, and Namhkam.

After Si Xingfa, Si Renfa was enthroned in 1413, and he tried to restore the kingdom to its former glory. In 1439, a conflict between Mong Mao and Ming reoccurred. This was the beginning of the Luchuan–Pingmian campaigns. In 1441, Ming sent troops to Mong Mao, and Si Renfa fled to Mongyang. Several wars occurred between 1443 and 1449, and finally, Mong Mao lost Dehong. The imperial family continued to live in Mongyang until they were attacked in 1604 by the Toungoo dynasty.

Ming and Qing dynasties

After the Mong Mao kingdom declined, the Chinese central government gained efficient control in the Dehong area. During the Ming and Qing dynasties, the central government canonized 10 Tusi in Dehong:

During the Ming dynasty, two Sino-Burmese wars occurred in Dehong. In 1594, Yunnan grand coordinator Chen Yongbin built up 8 border defense military checkpoints to guard the international border between Dehong and the Burmese Toungoo dynasty; these checkpoints formed the early border between China and Myanmar.

In 1658, the last emperor of the Southern Ming dynasty, Zhu Youlang, passed the Nandian and Ganya Tusi and fled to Myanmar. He granted Ganya Tusi a marquess title. Ganya Tusi helped Youlang to flee but was completely annihilated in the tussle. Thereafter, all the Tusi in Dehong surrendered to the Qing dynasty in 1659. The war between the Qing and Konbaung dynasties from 1765 to 1769 also extended to the Dehong area.

In 1875, a British translator, Augustus Raymond Margary, and his four personal staff members were murdered in the west of Yingjiang County. This was an important non-governmental crisis in Sino-British relations and came to be known as the "Margary Affair". This event was followed by the signing of the Yantai Treaty.

In 1894, during a Britain-China border convention, certain sections of the China–Myanmar border to the south of the "High Conical Peak"() were delimited, and an agreement was reached that the Qing dynasty would open two border ports between Burma and China: Manyun and Zhanxi. 

In 1897, another agreement was signed and three parts of the area around Dehong were incorporated into Burma, although the convention in 1894 had determined they were part of China, and four of the border checkpoints which were established by Chen Yongbin in the Ming dynasty were also incorporated into Burma. Under this agreement, the British government leased the "Namwan Assigned Tract" in the southwest of Dehong with the rent of 1,000 Rupees a year. Finally, China didn't get this region back and used it to exchange another area in the west of Cangyuan in 1960.

After the Qing dynasty

After the Wuchang Uprising occurred in October 1911, Ganya Tusi Dao Anren launched an uprising at Tengyue on 27 October 1911. Under the Republic of China, the Yunnan government tried to eliminate the Tusi system and replace Tusi with state-appointed officials, but the Tusi officials opposed the change. Therefore, special administrative divisions were formed to support the period of transition. The administrative titles included Suppress Committee and Deputy County between 1911 and 1917, District and Deputy County between 1917 and 1932, and Administrative Bureau after 1932.

The Tusi system existed until the land reform movement in 1955. The administrative bureaus after 1932 included Luxi, Ruili, Longchuan, Yingjiang, Lianshan, and Lianghe — they were the predecessors of future counties.

During World War II, Dehong was an important strategic location for China. By 1938, the Burma Road was built, and it was an important international transit channel after the Japanese army blocked the eastern coast of China. In 1939, the Central Aircraft Manufacturing Company moved to Loiwing in the south-west corner of Ruili, and it was the biggest aircraft manufacturing plant in China at that time.

After World War II

The area was declared an autonomous region in 1953. In May 1956, it became an autonomous prefecture. In 1960, when inter-provincial migration took place, many farmers came to Yunnan to farm bananas.  This was during the "Great Leap Forward" when a biologist working for Mao Zedong wrote an article about the weather in Yunnan being very suitable for bananas to be planted. Before this, many Chinese were scared of going there because of an illness that lurked about. It was later discovered that this was an identifiable tropical disease. The farmers helped to get rid of the disease. They made clearings, roads, and space for fields and plantations.

Geography

Demographics
The population of Dehong in 2003 was 1.02 million, 48.17% of whom were Han Chinese, and 51.83% of whom were national minorities, mostly Dai (Tai Nua) and Jingpo.

Climate

Administration
Dehong is divided into three counties and two county level cities:

The prefectural government seat is Mangshi.

Economy
Dehong is one of the three primary coffee cultivating regions in Yunnan. The main coffee planter and processor is Hogood Coffee, which operates a contracting scheme with local farmers. Hogood contracts farm land from smallholders on which it plants seedlings, and then re-contracts with farmers to purchase the coffee beans at harvest.

Further reading
 Luo, Yongxian. A Grammar of Dehong, Southwest China. Canberra, ACT: Pacific Linguistics, Research School of Pacific and Asian Studies, Australian National University, 1999.

Notes

References

External links

Dehong local government site (in Chinese)
Dehong tuanjie bao (magazine in Chinese)
Dehong (from Xinhuanet.com, in Chinese)

 
Autonomous prefectures of the People's Republic of China
Dai people
Jingpo people